Shenzhen Yucai High School is a school in Shekou, Shenzhen, Guangdong, China.

Founded in 1995, Shenzhen Yucai High school has been developed into a regional education system, consisted of primary schools, middle schools and technical sections.

The Shenzhen Yucai High School is the fifth oldest school in Shenzhen started in 1995. First school is Shenzhen Drug School, second oldest school is the Shenzhen Experiment School.

The notable alumni includes Shenglong Zou, founder of Xunlei Technology.

External links
 Official Website
 Official website 
 Shenzhen Yucai High School Video Introduction

High schools in Shenzhen
Educational institutions established in 1983
1983 establishments in China